Dadayra is a village in Hapur tehsil in Hapur district in Uttar Pradesh.

References

Villages in Hapur district